Suzanne Jambo is a South Sudanese politician, lawyer, and human rights campaigner.

Education 
Suzanne Jambo earned a degree in public law from the University of Buckingham, United Kingdom.

Career and politics 
Jambo has been an active human rights campaigner in South Sudan (and southern Sudan before that) for many years. She was a negotiator in the Intergovernmental Authority on Development-led peace process between 1998 and 2005, that resulted in the signing of the Comprehensive Peace Agreement in 2005, ending 21 years of civil war.  She worked with numerous local non-governmental organisations (NGOs) in southern Sudan to improve their administration, efficiency and size. She was particularly involved in those organisations that sought to protect women's rights.  In 2001, she authored the book Overcoming gender conflict and bias: the case of New Sudan women and girls.

She founded the New Sudanese Indigenous Network (NESI), an organisation to bring together 20 Sudanese NGOs to work on common issues such as women's rights, post-conflict rebuilding, human rights and democracy.  By 2007 NESI was working with 67 separate NGOs in the region. Jambo was appointed a commissioner for the Southern Sudan Law Drafting Commission which drafted the 2011 Constitution of South Sudan.

For an eight-year period, Jambo was a close adviser of current South Sudan president Salva Kiir Mayardit. This pre-dated Mayardit's presidency to his time with the Sudan People's Liberation Movement (SPLM) where Jambo served as his external relations secretary from at least 2010. She was the first female to act as secretary. She served in the same capacity until at least 2013 when she complained that there were too many advisers from international organisations in South Sudan's government.

She also disagreed with Mayardit over the appointment of his brother-in-law, Gregory Deng Kuac Aduol, as governor of Gogrial State rather than holding elections. As a result, Jambo is now a political opponent of the president. In October 2017, she announced her intention to stand for the presidency in the 2018 South Sudanese general election. Jambo is the first female to run as a presidential candidate in South Sudan.

References 

Living people
South Sudanese women in politics
South Sudanese lawyers
South Sudanese writers
South Sudanese human rights activists
Alumni of the University of Buckingham
Year of birth missing (living people)